Phanerochaete arizonica is a species of fungus. It is a plant pathogen that infects Platanus species.

References

Fungal tree pathogens and diseases
arizonica
Fungi described in 1974